"Sara" is a song written by singer-songwriter Stevie Nicks of the British-American rock band Fleetwood Mac, which was released as a single from the 1979 Tusk double LP. The vinyl album version length is 6 minutes 22 seconds, and the edited single version length is 4 minutes 37 seconds. The song peaked at No. 7 in the US for three weeks, No. 37 in the UK for two weeks, No. 11 in Australia, and No. 12 in Canada.

Origin
Speaking in a radio interview for the Friday Rock Show with Tommy Vance in the early 1990s, Stevie Nicks said the song was partially written about her good friend, Sara, who married Nicks' ex and bandmate, Mick Fleetwood.  

However, Nicks' former boyfriend Don Henley claimed that the song is about their unborn child. In 1979, Nicks said, "If I ever have a little girl, I will name her Sara. It's a very special name to me." In a 2014 Billboard interview Nicks said, "Had I married Don and had that baby, and had she been a girl, I would have named her Sara... It's accurate, but not the entirety of it."

In his 2014 autobiography, Fleetwood agreed with the suggestion that the song referred to an affair with a friend named Sara which ended his own relationship with Nicks. Fleetwood and Nicks had been involved in a romantic relationship in the late 1970s. The lyrics, "and he was just like a great dark wing/within the wings of a storm" refer to Fleetwood being an emotional comfort zone for Nicks following her breakup with fellow band member Lindsey Buckingham.
Although the relationship was not exclusive on either side, Fleetwood states that Nicks became upset when she learned of Fleetwood's relationship with her best friend, Sara. This relationship effectively ended the romance between Nicks and Fleetwood.

Reception
Cash Box called "Sara" "a lush, entrancing Stevie Nicks composition, with effectively echoed lead vocals by Nicks" and called the arrangement "glistening". Record World said that "While Stevie's vocals haunt, the inimitable McVie-Fleetwood rhythm section hypnotizes."

Versions
The version of the song featured on the original vinyl release of Tusk was the unedited 6:22 version, but when Tusk was first released as a single compact disc in 1987 it featured the edited single version, which leaves out the middle verse and musical bridge. It was not until the 1988 Fleetwood Mac Greatest Hits compilation was released that the 6:22 version of the song became available on compact disc.

There is also a version known as "the cleaning lady" edit, so-called as Nicks is heard at the beginning of the demo recording, "I don't want to be a cleaning lady!" This version lasts almost nine minutes and was released on the 2-disc remastered version Tusk in March 2004. The song contains an extended vamp, which includes excised lines previously only heard in live performances, such as, "and the wind became crazy", "no sorrow for sorrow, you can have no more", and "swallow all your pride, don't you ever change—never change".

On 5 November 2015, a live version was released as part of a remastered Tusk. This recording features a heavier hitting drum beat from Fleetwood.

The 2018 Fleetwood Mac 50 Years – Don't Stop album includes a remastered single version of the song that runs 4:37.

Plagiarism suit
In 1980, Nicks was sued for plagiarism by a songwriter who had submitted a song called "Sara", which she had sent to Warner Bros. in 1978. Nicks showed that she had written and recorded a demo version of the song in July 1978, before the lyrics were sent to Warner, and the complainant accepted that no plagiarism had occurred.

Personnel
 Stevie Nicks – lead vocals, tack piano
 Lindsey Buckingham – acoustic guitars, backing vocals
 Christine McVie – keyboards, piano, backing vocals
 John McVie – bass guitar
 Mick Fleetwood – drums

Charts

Weekly charts

Year-end charts

Certifications

References

Fleetwood Mac songs
1979 singles
1979 songs
Songs written by Stevie Nicks
Song recordings produced by Ken Caillat
Song recordings produced by Richard Dashut
Songs about abortion
Songs involved in plagiarism controversies
Warner Records singles